Walter Samuel "Edy" Tavares da Veiga (born 22 March 1992) is a Cape Verdean professional basketball player for Real Madrid of the Liga ACB and the EuroLeague. He was selected with the 43rd overall pick in 2014 NBA draft by the Atlanta Hawks and has played internationally for the Cape Verde national basketball team.

After being scouted in his hometown, Tavares started playing for Gran Canaria in 2009. He was drafted in the 2014 NBA draft by the Atlanta Hawks were he played one season. In 2017, Tavares signed with Real Madrid where he became a star player, winning one EuroLeague title and three All-EuroLeague Team selections, as well as several domestic accolades. Tavares is the EuroLeague's all-time leader in blocks.

Tavares guided the Cape Verdean national team to their first-ever World Cup in 2023, and has played at AfroBasket in 2013 and 2021.

Early life
Tavares was born in Cape Verde on the island of Maio. Tavares worked as a cashier in his grandmother's shop after school and played beach football as a hobby. He did not play any basketball until he was 17 years old, and his talent was discovered by a German tourist who was on vacation in Cape Verde in 2009. The tourist set up a meeting between Tavares and his friend, Raúl Rodriguez, who was a Spanish director of the CB Gran Canaria youth academy. After Rodriguez received a photo that showed Tavares' size, they later met in Praia.

He started playing at the Gran Canaria youth academy, where a second under-18 team was created to accommodate Tavares.

Professional career

Spain
From 2009 to 2011, Tavares played for CB Gran Canaria's junior team in the Liga EBA. In 2011, he was loaned to UB La Palma of the LEB Oro for the 2011–12 season. In 2012, he returned to Gran Canaria and made his Liga ACB debut on 6 January 2013. He also played three games for La Palma in 2012–13 as well.

In April 2013, Tavares declared for the 2013 NBA draft but later withdrew his name and returned to Gran Canaria for the 2013–14 season.

On 19 June 2014, Tavares re-signed with Gran Canaria on a three-year deal, while still remaining eligible for the 2014 NBA draft.

On 26 June 2014, Tavares was selected with the 43rd overall pick in the 2014 NBA draft by the Atlanta Hawks, becoming the first Cape Verdean-born player to be drafted in the NBA. On 26 August 2014, it was announced Tavares would return to Gran Canaria for the 2014–15 season. During their 2014–15 season, Tavares earned All-EuroCup First Team honors.

Atlanta Hawks
On 6 July 2015, Tavares joined the Atlanta Hawks for the 2015 NBA Summer League. Three days later, he signed a multi-year deal with the Hawks. He made his debut for the Hawks on 29 October recording one point and one rebound in a 112–101 win over the New York Knicks. During his rookie season, using the flexible assignment rule, Tavares received multiple assignments to the Austin Spurs, Canton Charge and Bakersfield Jam of the NBA Development League. On 31 October 2016, he was waived by the Hawks after appearing in one game for the team in the 2016–17 season.

Raptors 905
On 12 November 2016, Tavares was acquired by Raptors 905 of the NBA Development League. On February 6, 2017, he was named in the Eastern Conference All-Star team for the 2017 NBA D-League All-Star Game. At the season's end, he was named the recipient of the NBA Development League Defensive Player of the Year Award.

Cleveland Cavaliers
On 12 April 2017, Tavares signed with the Cleveland Cavaliers. He made his debut for the Cavaliers that night, recording 10 rebounds and 6 blocks in a 99–83 loss to the Toronto Raptors. Tavares did not play at all in the 2017 playoffs due to a hand injury. On 11 October 2017, Tavares was waived by the Cavaliers.

Brief return to Raptors 905
Shortly after getting waived by the Cavaliers, Tavares returned to Raptors 905, ultimately playing only one regular season game for them, scoring 13 points, with 10 rebounds and 3 blocks vs. the Grand Rapids Drive on 5 November 2017.

Return to Spain

2017–18 season 
On 10 November 2017, Tavares signed with Real Madrid until the end of the 2019–20 season. In May 2018, Real Madrid won the 2017–18 EuroLeague championship, after defeating Fenerbahçe in the final game with 85–80. Over 17 EuroLeague games, Tavares averaged 6.5 points, 5.3 rebounds and 1.5 blocks per game.

2018–19 season 
Tavares won the 2018–19 ACB season with Madrid. In the 2018–19 EuroLeague, he was named the EuroLeague Best Defender.

2019–20 season 
On 21 September 2019, Tavares set an individual record for most blocks in a Spanish Supercup game, with 7 blocks in the semi-final against Fuenlabrada. Real went on to win the Supercup for a second year in a row. The season was suspended due to the COVID-19 pandemic.

2020–21 season 
In the 2020–21 season, Tavares was named to the All-EuroLeague First Team for the first time in his career. He was also named the EuroLeague Best Defender for the second time in his career.

2021–22 season 
In the EuroLeague, Tavares made a second straight All-EuroLeague First Team selection.

In June, Tavares won his third Liga ACB championship. On 19 June 2022, he had a double-double of 25 points and 13 rebounds in Game 4 of the finals; the 81–74 win over Barcelona clinched Madrid's title. Tavares was named the ACB Finals MVP after the series in which he averaged 13.2 points, 6.2 rebounds and 20 index rating per game.

2022–23 season 
Tavares opened the season by helping Madrid win their 5th consecutive Supercopa de España and was named MVP after his 24-point and 12-rebounds performance on against Barcelona in the final.

National team career
Tavares played with the Cape Verde national basketball team at AfroBasket 2013. The following seven years, Tavares did not represent his country due to his club's incompatible dates with the FIBA tournaments. Tavares was again on the roster of Cape Verde for AfroBasket 2021. He helped his country reach the fourth place in the tournament, while individually he was named to the All-AfroBasket Team as well.

In February 2023, during the last window of the 2023 FIBA Basketball World Cup qualifiers, Tavares joined Cape Verde again and helped the team qualify for its first-ever World Cup. Cape Verde became the smallest nation to ever to qualify for a World Cup.

Career statistics

NBA

|-
| align="left" | 
| align="left" | Atlanta
| 11 || 0 || 6.6 || .579 || .000 || .375 || 1.9 || .3 || .1 || .6 || 2.3
|-
| align="left" | 
| align="left" | Atlanta
| 1 || 0 || 4.0 || 1.000 || .000 || .000 || 1.0 || .0 || .0 || .0 || 2.0
|-
| align="left" | 
| align="left" | Cleveland
| 1 || 0 || 24.0 || .750 || .000 || .000 || 10.0 || 1.0 || .0 || 6.0 || 6.0
|-
| style="text-align:center;" colspan="2"|Career
| 13 || 0 || 7.8 || .625 || .000 || .273 || 2.5 || .3 || .1 || .9 || 2.5
|-

EuroLeague

|-
| style="text-align:left;background:#AFE6BA;"| 2017–18†
| style="text-align:left;" rowspan=5| Real Madrid
| 29 || 23 || 17.4 || .682 || .000 || .623 || 5.3 || .5 || .4 || 1.5 || 6.5 || 10.6
|-
| style="text-align:left;"| 2018–19
| 34 || 28 || 19.4 || style="background:#CFECEC;"|.794 || .000 || .632 || 6.2 || .7 || .4 || style="background:#CFECEC;"| 1.7 || 7.4 || 13.4
|-
| style="text-align:left;"| 2019–20
| 28 || 28 || 22.5 || .685 || .000 || .653 || 7.1 || .8 || .6 || 2.2 || 7.2 || 14.5
|-
| style="text-align:left;"| 2020–21
| 36 || 31 || 26.0 || .651 || .000 || .716 || style="background:#CFECEC;"| 8.0 || 1.1 || 1.0 || style="background:#CFECEC;"| 1.8 || 11.4 || 18.1
|-
| style="text-align:left;"| 2021–22
| 35 || 34 || 22.6 || .695 || .000 || .737 || 7.5 || 1.0 || .9 || style="background:#CFECEC;"| 1.7 || 10.9 || 18.4

|- class="sortbottom"
| colspan=2 style="text-align:center;"| Career
|162 || 144 || 21.6 || .694 || .000 || .683 || 6.9 || .8 || .7 || 1.8 || 8.9 || 15.0

Domestic leagues

See also
List of Cape Verdeans
List of tallest players in National Basketball Association history

References

External links

 Edy Tavares at acb.com 
 Edy Tavares at euroleague.net

1992 births
Living people
Atlanta Hawks draft picks
Atlanta Hawks players
Austin Spurs players
Bakersfield Jam players
Canton Charge players
Cape Verdean expatriate basketball people in Canada
Cape Verdean expatriate basketball people in Spain
Cape Verdean men's basketball players
CB Gran Canaria players
Centers (basketball)
Cleveland Cavaliers players
Liga ACB players
People from Maio, Cape Verde
Raptors 905 players
Real Madrid Baloncesto players
UB La Palma players